Sarromyia is a genus of flies in the family Tachinidae.

Species
S. nubigena Pokorny, 1893

References

Tachininae
Tachinidae genera